The National Street Gazetteer (NSG) is a database of all streets in England and Wales compiled from the responsible highway authorities which is restricted to local authorities and statutory undertakers (e.g. for maintenance or installing services).

Database
In the United Kingdom local authorities have responsibility for the creation and maintenance of streets as well as the management of street works. The NSG brings together the knowledge spread across local authorities and is a repository for combining the local street gazetteers they are required to keep. Maintenance of the NSG is covered by the National Streetworks Register legislation and is a statutory requirement of local authorities.

In effect, the NSG has become the definitive list of all streets in England and Wales and provides a definitive identification of all streets with the use of a Unique Street Reference Number (USRN).

On a monthly basis, highway authorities are required to upload their street gazetteers, along with Associated Street Data (ASD), to the NSG; a master index built to the national standard BS 7666, for access by a number of other organisations via the NSG online hub and managed by GeoPlace. This enables third-party organisations such as public utilities to meet their statutory requirements to provide the appropriate streetworks notifications.

The NSG has exceeded its initial aims to provide a consistent and unambiguous identification of streets and their associated streetworks. The street gazetteer has become a foundation for the National Land and Property Gazetteer (NLPG). It has also become the basis for Transport for London's (TfL) road network through the Pan London Street Gazetteer.

Originally the NSG was managed by the national mapping agency for the UK, Ordnance Survey (OS). However, it became clear that OS was unwilling or unable to provide a rigorous management of the service. Part of this may have been because OS was operating outside of their acknowledged expertise in mapping rather than data management, although it has been suggested  that OS simply saw no commercial advantage in developing the NSG.

In May 2005 the Mapping Services Agreement (MSA) was signed with local authorities. This was part of a long drawn out process of procurement for mapping data and included management of the NSG and the NLPG. The outcome of agreement involved the loss of the custodianship by OS of the NSG which was awarded to the data management company Intelligent Addressing Ltd who were already managers of the NLPG.

See also
National Address Gazetteer
National Streetworks Gazetteer

External links
National Street Gazetteer

Databases in England
Geography of England
Gazetteers
Databases in Wales
Geography of Wales
Geographical databases in the United Kingdom